Behjat Abad is a tiny market place located in central Tehran, the capital city of Iran. It is home to a variety of Asian food ingredients targeting the expat community living in Tehran.

The grocery stores also act as wholesalers and source Chinese and Japanese ingredients to International restaurants of Tehran as well as the general public. They stock most of the essential pastes, sauces, noodles etc. used in Asian cuisine. You could find sacks of Thai or Chinese rice, Taiwanese rice crackers and Japanese Seaweed. The market also sells fish and other seafood items. The majority of goods are imported from East Asia particularly from Mainland China.

See also

City Council of Tehran
International rankings of Iran
Iran International Exhibitions Company

External links 
 https://web.archive.org/web/20170503163727/http://en.tehran.ir/ Tehran Municipality website
 http://www.avval.ir/ Official Tehran Yellow pages (Ketabe Avval)
 Voy:Tehran travel guide from Wikivoyage
 https://maps.google.com/maps?q=behjatabad&ie=UTF8&hnear=Behjat+Abad,+Tehr%C4%81n,+Tehran,+Iran&t=h&z=15

Buildings and structures in Tehran
Bazaars in Iran
Tourist attractions in Tehran